Joseph Henri Jean-Claude Tremblay (January 22, 1939 – December 7, 1994) was a Canadian ice hockey defenceman for the NHL Montreal Canadiens and the WHA Quebec Nordiques, notable for play-making and defensive skills.

Playing career
After an amateur and minor professional career that saw him move from left wing to defence and win the league Most Valuable Player title in 1960, Tremblay began play for the Canadiens in that season and stuck with the big league squad for good in the 1961–1962 season, playing for five Stanley Cup winning teams. He became one of the NHL's preeminent stars on defence for both his offense and defensive work, playing in seven NHL All-Star Games and setting the franchise record for points by a defenceman, and was recognized as a first team All-Star in 1971 and a Second Team All-Star in 1968.

In 1972, Tremblay jumped to the upstart WHA with the Nordiques, which had negotiated with the Los Angeles Sharks for his rights. He was the franchise's first great star, as well as the league's first great defenceman, winning the league honors for best defenceman in 1973 and 1975 and being named to the WHA's Team Canada in 1974, leading that club in defensive scoring. Tremblay also led his team to the 1977 AVCO World Trophy championship. He was the only player to play for the Nordiques all seven seasons of the WHA, and retired after the 1979 season. His number #3 jersey was retired by the Nordiques after that season just before the franchise's move into the NHL, thus gaining Tremblay the distinction of being one of only three players to have a number retired by a NHL team without ever actually playing for it (the other two being Johnny McKenzie by the Hartford Whalers and Frank Finnigan by the modern-day Ottawa Senators). He later scouted in Europe for the Montreal Canadiens.

In 1979, he donated a kidney to his daughter. Tremblay died of kidney cancer himself on December 7, 1994, at the age of 55.

Honors and achievements 
 Won Stanley Cups in 1965, 1966, 1968, 1969 and 1971
 At the time of leaving the Canadiens, was in the top fifty all-time NHL assist leaders
 Played in the NHL All-Star Game in 1959, 1965, 1967, 1968, 1969, 1971 and 1972
 Named to the 1972 Summit Series Canadian team but dropped after he signed with the WHA
 Named to the WHA first All-Star team in 1973, 1975 and 1976
 Named to the WHA second All-Star team in 1974
 Led the WHA in assists in 1973 and 1976
 Played seven seasons with the Nordiques, playing in 454 games and scoring 66 goals and 358 assists for 424 points
 Second in WHA history in assists, fourteenth in points, and sixteen in games played
 Named to NHL first All-Star team in 1971
 Named to NHL second All-Star team in 1968
 A street in Vaudreuil-Dorion, Quebec was named after him (along with other greats)
 Elected as an inaugural member to the World Hockey Association Hall of Fame in 2010
 An arena is named after him in La Baie, Quebec (Now part of the City of Saguenay, QC)

Career statistics

Regular season and playoffs

References

External links
 
 

1939 births
1994 deaths
Buffalo Bisons (AHL) players
Canadian ice hockey defencemen
Deaths from cancer in Quebec
Deaths from kidney cancer
Sportspeople from Saguenay, Quebec
Montreal Canadiens players
National Hockey League players with retired numbers
Quebec Nordiques (WHA) players
Stanley Cup champions
Ice hockey people from Quebec